The IPHWR (Indian Pressurized Heavy Water Reactor) is a class of Indian pressurized heavy-water reactors designed by the Bhabha Atomic Research Centre. The baseline 220 MWe design was developed from the CANDU based RAPS-1 and RAPS-2 reactors built at Rawatbhata, Rajasthan. The design was later expanded into 540 MW and 700 MW designs. Currently there are 17 units of various types operational at various locations in India.

IPHWR-220 

The first PHWR units built in India (RAPS-1 and RAPS-2) are of Canadian CANDU design similar to the first full-scale Canadian reactor built at Douglas point, Ontario. The reactors were set up in collaboration with Government of Canada. Starting in 1963, 100 MWe RAPS-1 was mostly built with equipment and technology supplied by AECL, Canada. RAPS-1 was commissioned in 1973 but the cessation of Canadian cooperation in light of successful development of nuclear weapons by India as part of Operation Smiling Buddha the RAPS-2 commissioning could only be completed by 1981 where some elements of the design were indigenized by Bhabha Atomic Research Centre in partnership with Indian manufacturers Larsen & Toubro and Bharat Heavy Electricals Limited. Successively, a totally Indian design of 220 MWe power capacity was designed and two units were built at Kalpakkam in Tamil Nadu state christened MAPS-1 and MAPS-2. MAPS-1&2 design was evolved from RAPS-1&2, with modifications carried out to suit the coastal location and also introduction of suppression pool to limit containment peak pressure under loss of coolant accident (LOCA) in lieu of dousing tanks in RAPS-1&2. In addition, MAPS-1&2 have partial double containment. This design was further improved and all subsequent PHWR units in India have double containment.

With experience of design and operation of earlier units and indigenous R&D efforts, major modifications were introduced in NAPS-1&2. These units are the basis of standardized Indian PHWR units later designated as IPHWR-220.

The design of subsequent units i.e. KGS-1, KGS-2, RAPS-3, RAPS-4, RAPS-5, RAPS-6, KGS-3 and KGS-4 is of standard Indian PHWR design. The major improvements in these designs include valve-less primary heat transport system and a unitized control room concept. In addition, the design of these units included improvements in Control and Instrumentation system and incorporation of computer based systems to match with the advancement in technology.

IPHWR-540 

Upon completion of the design of IPHWR-220, a larger 540 MWe design was started  under the aegis of BARC in partnership with NPCIL. Two reactors of this design were built in Tarapur, Maharashtra starting in the year 2000 and the first was commissioned on 12 September 2005.

IPHWR-700 

The IPHWR-540 design was later upgraded to a 700 MWe with the main objective to improve fuel efficiency and develop a standardized design to be installed at many locations across India as a fleet-mode effort. The design was also upgraded to incorporate Generation III+ features.

The 700 MWe PHWR design includes some features, which are introduced for the first time in Indian PHWRs which include partial boiling at the coolant channel outlet, interleaving of primary heat transport system feeders, passive decay heat removal system, regional over power protection, containment spray system, mobile fuel transfer machine, and a steel liner on the inner containment wall.

Technical specifications

See also
 IPHWR-220, first version of the IPHWR class of recators
 IPHWR-700, Generation III+ successor to the IPHWR-220 design
 CANDU, predecessor to Indian PHWR designs
 AHWR-300, thorium fuelled PHWR design for the Indian Three stage nuclear power programme
 India's three-stage nuclear power programme
 Nuclear power in India

References 

Nuclear power reactor types
Indian inventions
Nuclear power in India
Pressurized water reactors